The Komi-Yazva language (Коми-Ёдз кыл, Komi-Yodz kyl) is spoken mostly in Krasnovishersky District of Perm Krai in Russia, in the basin of the Yazva (Yodz) River. It is a Permic language closely related to Komi-Zyrian and Permyak. It has no official status.

About two thousand speakers densely live in Krasnovishersky District.

Studies
Availability of the particular vowels together with features of phonetics and stress system led Finnish linguist Arvid Genetz in 1889 to consider Komi-Yodzyak as a separate dialect. Later, this decision was confirmed by the famous Finno-Ugricist Vasily Lytkin, who studied the Komi-Yodzyak idiom in depth from 1949 until 1953.

Linguogeography 
Area and number

In the early 1960s, about 2,000 speakers lived compactly on the territory of Krasnovishersky District of Perm Krai (Antipinskaya, Parshakovskaya, Bychinskaya and Verkh-Yazvinskaya village administrations). In total, there were about 3,000 language-speakers.

Status 
The presence of special vowel sounds, specific phonetics and accent system allowed first Finnish linguist Arvid Genetz, who studied the people in 1889, and then the Finno-Ugric philologist Vasily Lytkin, who visited the Komi-Yazvinians three times between 1949 and 1953, to identify the Komi-Yazvinians as a separate dialect. Some researchers consider it to be a dialect of the Permian Komi language.

Alphabet
The first Komi-Yazva primer was printed in 2003. Its author was the teacher of the Parshavskaya school A. L. Parshakova. This book also became the first one ever printed in Komi-Yazva language.

See also
Komi peoples
Komi-Permyak language
Permians

References

Bibliography 

Лыткин В. И., Тепляшина Т. И. Пермские языки // Основы финно-угорского языкознания / ИЯ АН СССР. — Т.3. — М.: Наука, 1976.
= Lytkin, V. I.; Teplyashina, T. I. "Permic languages". The Fundamentals of Fenno-Ugric linguistics. (The Academy of Sciences of the USSR.) Vol. 3. Moscow: Nauka, 1976.
Лыткин В. И. Коми-язьвинский диалект. — М.: Издательсвто АН СССР, 1961.
= Lytkin, V. I. (ed.) The Komi-Yazva dialect. Moscow, 1961.
Коми-пермяцкий язык / Под ред. проф. В. И. Лыткина. — Кудымкар: Коми-пермяцкое книжное издательство, 1962.
= Lytkin, V. I. (ed.) The Komi-Permyak language. Kudymkar, 1962.
Паршакова А. Л. Коми-язьвинский букварь. Пермь, 2003.
= Parshakova, A. L. Komi-Yazva primer. Perm, 2003.

Komi language
Languages of Russia
Perm Krai